Andrei Viktorovich Samokhvalov (born May 10, 1975) is a Kazakhstani former professional ice hockey player. He played for Kazakhstan National Hockey Team at the 2006 Olympic Winter Games. Andrei Samokhvalov is the graduate of Ust-Kamenogorsk ice hockey school. He drafted 208th overall in the round eight of 1995 NHL Entry Draft by Detroit Red Wings, but never signed a contract with them.

Career statistics

Regular season and playoffs

International

External links

1975 births
Living people
Avangard Omsk players
Detroit Red Wings draft picks
Metallurg Novokuznetsk players
HC MVD players
HC Spartak Moscow players
Kazakhstani ice hockey right wingers
Kazzinc-Torpedo players
HC Khimik Voskresensk players
HK Mogilev players
Sportspeople from Oskemen
Salavat Yulaev Ufa players
Soviet ice hockey right wingers
Torpedo Nizhny Novgorod players
Ice hockey players at the 2006 Winter Olympics
Olympic ice hockey players of Kazakhstan
Asian Games gold medalists for Kazakhstan
Medalists at the 1996 Asian Winter Games
Asian Games medalists in ice hockey
Ice hockey players at the 1996 Asian Winter Games